Humay District is one of eight districts of the province Pisco in Peru.

See also 
List of mines in Peru

Zinc mining

References

1855 establishments in Peru